Swansboro is a town in Onslow County, North Carolina, United States, located along the Atlantic Ocean. In 2010, the population was 2,663.

History
Swansboro started as a settlement around the plantation of Theophilus Weeks. In 1783, Swansboro was incorporated as a town, taking its name from Samuel Swann, a Speaker in the North Carolina House of Commons and a resident of Onslow County. In 1818, Otway Burns built the Prometheus, the first river steamboat constructed in North Carolina.

The town, originally spelled Swannsborough, is sometimes called "The Friendly City by the Sea". M.N. Lisk, a popular Swansboro mayor, initiated the annual Mullet Festival, one of the first coastal seafood festivals in North Carolina.

The town is featured as the setting of Nicholas Sparks' novel The Guardian.

The Swansboro Historic District was listed on the National Register of Historic Places in 1990.

In 2018, Swansboro was among the hardest hit cities by Hurricane Florence. A record 30.58 inches (77 cm) of rain fell at Swansboro, North Carolina, breaking the previous state record of 24.06 inches (61 cm).

Geography
Swansboro is located at  (34.693327, -77.127327).

Town government
The Town of Swansboro is governed by five Board of Commissioner members and the Mayor. The Commissioners are elected for four-year and two-year terms. The Mayor is elected for a four-year term.  They are elected as Town-wide representatives. The Mayor presides at all meetings as the "Chairman" of the Board of Commissioners. The mayor votes only to break a tie, and the Mayor Pro Tem is appointed by the Commissioners and conducts the meetings in the absence of the Mayor.

Demographics

2020 census

As of the 2020 United States census, there were 3,744 people, 1,360 households, and 755 families residing in the town.

2000 census
As of the census of 2000, there were 1,426 people, 655 households, and 419 families residing in the town. The population density was 1,168.2 people per square mile (451.3/km). There were 770 housing units at an average density of 630.8 per square mile (243.7/km). The racial makeup of the town was 90.18% White, 4.63% African American, 0.21% Native American, 0.77% Asian, 0.91% from other races, and 3.30% from two or more races. Hispanic or Latino of any race were 2.81% of the population.

There were 655 households, out of which 28.9% had children under the age of 18 living with them, 44.6% were married couples living together, 15.0% had a female householder with no husband present, and 36.0% were non-families. 32.4% of all households were made up of individuals, and 13.1% had someone living alone who was 65 years of age or older. The average household size was 2.18 and the average family size was 2.72.

In the town, the population was spread out, with 24.4% under the age of 18, 7.6% from 18 to 24, 28.1% from 25 to 44, 23.1% from 45 to 64, and 16.8% who were 65 years of age or older. The median age was 38 years. For every 100 females, there were 83.5 males. For every 100 females age 18 and over, there were 81.2 males.

The median income for a household in the town was $37,740, and the median income for a family was $45,357. Males had a median income of $32,188 versus $25,556 for females. The per capita income for the town was $19,625. About 10.3% of families and 11.9% of the population were below the poverty line, including 18.9% of those under age 18 and 7.6% of those age 65 or over.

Education
 Queens Creek Elementary School
 Swansboro Elementary School
 Swansboro Middle School
 Swansboro High School

Tourism
Swansboro sits across the Intracoastal Waterway from Hammocks Beach State Park and is a popular destination for tourists, outdoor enthusiasts and recreational fishermen.

The city has a diverse selection of restaurants (including Yana's Ye Olde Drug Store diner and Icehouse Waterfront) and shopping much of which is located along the Intracoastal Waterway or White Oak River basin. Residents and visitors alike have multiple boating facilities to choose from (including Casper's Marina and Dudley's Marina) and many restaurants allow for boaters to dock outside their establishments.

The Rotary Club of Swansboro is active in the community and regularly hosts events such as the annual King Mackerel Tournament and numerous fundraising gatherings. The Mullet Festival is the most notable and longest running Annual festival of 68 years that features a parade, street vendors, and live music. During the summers, the Seaside Arts Council hosts weekly concerts aptly named "Swan Fest" on Sunday evenings at the Pavilion in Olde Town Square.

Notable person 
Otway Burns, (c. 1775–1850), privateer and North Carolina State Senator, was born at Queen's Creek near Swansboro.

References

External links
 Tourism website
 Town Festivals
 Town website
 Swansboro Chamber of Commerce
 Swansboro NC InsiderInfo.us Area Guide
 

Towns in North Carolina
Towns in Onslow County, North Carolina
Populated places established in 1783
Populated coastal places in North Carolina